Thomas Silberberger (born 3 June 1973) is an Austrian football manager and former footballer who played as a midfielder. He is the manager of WSG Tirol.

External links
 

1973 births
Living people
Austrian footballers
FC Tirol Innsbruck players
Grazer AK players
FC Red Bull Salzburg players
Association football midfielders
Austrian football managers
Austrian Football Bundesliga managers
WSG Tirol managers